The 10th Emmy Awards, later referred to as the 10th Primetime Emmy Awards, were held on April 15, 1958, to honor the best in television of the year. The ceremony was held at  the Coconut Grove in Hollywood, California. It was hosted by Danny Thomas. All nominations are listed, with winners in bold and series' networks are in parentheses.

The anthology drama Playhouse 90, was the top show for the second consecutive year, earning the most major nominations (11) and wins (4).

Winners and nominees
Winners are listed first, highlighted in boldface, and indicated with a double dagger (‡).

Programs

Acting

Lead performances

Supporting performances

Single performances

Directing

Writing

Most major nominations
By network 
 CBS – 57
 NBC – 43
 ABC – 6

 By program
 Playhouse 90 (CBS) – 11
 Father Knows Best (NBC) – 6
 Caesar's Hour (NBC) / Hallmark Hall of Fame (NBC)  – 5
 Gunsmoke (CBS) / The Phil Silvers Show (CBS) / Studio One (CBS) / Tonight Starring Jack Paar (NBC) – 4
 The Dinah Shore Chevy Show (NBC) / I Love Lucy (CBS) / Omnibus (NBC) – 3

Most major awards
By network 
 CBS – 12
 NBC – 9
 ABC – 1

 By program
 Playhouse 90 (CBS)  – 4
 The Dinah Shore Chevy Show (NBC) – 3
 Father Knows Best (NBC) / Omnibus (NBC) / The Phil Silvers Show (CBS) – 2

Notes

References

External links
 Emmys.com list of 1958 Nominees & Winners
 

010
Primetime Emmy Awards
Primetime Emmy Awards
Primetime Emmy Awards
Primetime Emmy Awards
Primetime Emmy Awards